Rituparna Sengupta is Indian actress and producer who is known for her work in Bengali cinema and Hindi cinema. One of the most successful actresses of Bengali cinema, she rode the crest of her box office success in the late 1990s. She won a National Award, two Filmfare Awards, four BFJA Awards and four Anandalok Awards.

Initially promoted as the carbon copy of Satabdi Roy, Sengupta made her screen debut opposite Kushal Chakraborty in the Bengali fantasy TV series Shwet Kapot (1989) directed by the latter and broadcast on DD Bangla. She was catapulted to stardom after she made her big screen debut with Prabhat Roy's National Award-winning Bengali film Shwet Patharer Thala (1992). She made her Bollywood debut with Partho Ghosh's Teesra Kaun (1994). She had a very successful on screen collaboration with Prosenjit, Chiranjeet and Manna. She featured opposite Prosenjit for the first time in Bhijoy Bhaskar's Nagpanchami (1994) which was a major commercial success. Her other major hits opposite Prosenjit include Abujh Mon (1996), Moner Manush (1997), Pabitra Papi (1997), Baba Keno Chakar (1998), Daay Dayitwa (1999), Sindur Khela (1999), Sudhu Ekbar Bolo (1999), Tumi Ele Tai (1999), Sasurbari Zindabad (2000) and Praktan (2016). Her first collaboration with Chiranjeet was Prashant Nanda's Lal Paan Bibi (1994) which was also a major financial success. Her other hits opposite Chiranjeet include Naginkanya (1995), Rakhal Raja (1995), Sansar Sangram (1995), Chandragrahan (1997), Bishnu Narayan (1998), Sindur Khela (1999), Bastir Meye Radha (2000) and Hatiyar (2001). She teamed up with Manna for the first time in Sharif Uddin Khan Dipu's commercially successful Bangladeshi film Desh Dorodi (1998). Her other hits with Manna include Killer (2000), Shesh Juddho (2000), Jummon Koshai, Eri Naam Bhalobasa, Ranangan (2004), Swami Chintai (2006). She received critical acclaim for her roles in films such as Dahan (1997), Utsab (2000), Paromitar Ek Din (2000), Chaturanga (2008) and Ahaa Re (2019).

Early life
Rituparna was interested in the arts since a young age and learned painting, dancing, singing and handicrafts at a painting school, called Chitrangshu. She studied at Carmel High school, and later graduated in history from Lady Brabourne College. She began studying Modern History for an M.A. at University of Calcutta, but had to interrupt studies to concentrate on her career as an actress.

Career

Debut and initial struggle (1989—1991)

Sengupta made her screen debut opposite Kushal Chakraborty in the Bengali fantasy TV series Shwet Kapot (1989) broadcast on DD Bangla. Chakraborty's sister Anindita was her classmate. After her Secondary Examination, she was insisted by Anindita to appear for a screen test for a role opposite Chakraborty in the TV series. The work was an adaptation of the Danish fairy tale The White Dove. She had to play an imprisoned princess shapeshifting into a white dove who falls in love with an imprisoned prince played by Chakraborty. Initially her father made objection against her pursuing the role but then gave his consent since the role demanded two-day shoot. Due to Chakraborty's stardom, the sitcom grabbed the attention of media personalities. She accepted a role in Ramen Adhikari's Bengali sitcom Hortoner Golam that featured Kaushik Banerjee as the protagonist. It is based on Monilal Ganguly's Bengali story of the same name. She enacted a few more roles in several other Bengali TV series but those never took off her career.

Breakthrough and success (1992—2007)

After Gargi Roychowdhury declined the role of Titli opposite Bhaskar Banerjee in Prabhat Roy's National Award winning Bengali film Shwet Pathorer Thala (1992), Sengupta was offered to play the character. She featured opposite Prosenjit Chatterjee in Bhijoy Bhaskar's Nag Panchami (1994) and Chiranjeet Chakraborty in Prashanta Nanda's Laal Paan Bibi (1994). Since both the films worked at the box office, producers and directors approached her with meaty roles opposite Chatterjee and Chakraborty. Sengupta made her Bollywood debut opposite Chunkey Pandey in Partho Ghosh's thriller Teesra Kaun (1994) which was a debacle at the box office.

Sengupta bagged the female lead in Swapan Saha's Sujan Sakhi (1995) alongside Abhishek Chatterjee essaying the male lead. The film was a remake of Khan Ataur Rahman's Sujon Sokhi (1975). The film was a major success at the box office. She featured opposite Chiranjeet Chakraborty in the latter's directorial venture Sansar Sangram (1995). The film retaining a highly melodramatic approach appeased the rural audience of West Bengal. She featured opposite Mithun Chakraborty in Raghuram's Bhagya Debata (1995). The film was a major financial success. She featured in Zee's home-production Mohini (1995), directed by Hema Malini. The telefilm stars Madhu and Sudesh Berry as the protagonists.

Sengupta hit the pinnacle of her professional rivalry with Satabdi Roy in the late 1990s since the two were offered most of the female leads opposite Prosenjit Chatterjee after Debashree Roy vowed not to work with Chatterjee any longer. Sreelekha Mitra claimed that Sengupta had an extramarital affair with Chatterjee, which helped her get most of the female leads opposite Chatterjee. She featured opposite Chatterjee in a string of commercially successful Bengali films such as Abujh Mon (1996), Matir Manush (1997), Mayar Badhon (1997), Moner Manush (1997), Pabitra Papi (1997), Samadhan (1997), Tomake Chai (1997), Baba Keno Chakar (1998), Praner Cheye Priyo (1998), Daay Dayitwa (1999), Madhu Malati (1999), Sindur Khela (1999), Sudhu Ekbar Bolo (1999), Tumi Ele Tai (1999), Aasroy (2000), Madhur Milan (2000) and Sasurbari Zindabad (2000) to name a few.

Some of her hits in Bangladeshi cinema include Sagarika (1998), Tomar Amar Prem (1998), Ranga Bou (1999).

She featured in Aparna Sen's Paromitar Ek Din (2000).

After her fallout with Prosenjit Chatterjee, she found herself in a very debilitating state.

Swapan Saha cast Sengupta alongside Abhishek Chatterjee, Tapas Paul and Satabdi Roy in his family drama Sukh Dukkher Sansar (2003). The film was a financial success.

In 2004, Sengupta had 1 Odia Film Katha deithili Maa ku with Dynamic Star Siddhanta Mahapatra  only successful Venture of 2004,all other 12 releases in Bengali cinema, all of which became box office debacles generating the common notion among the filmmakers that the actress had lost her market value. Sengupta starred in Sushanta Saha's Sagar Kinare (2004) where she shared silver screen with Debashree Roy for the first time. She featured opposite Rajpal Yadav in Chandan Arora's critically acclaimed Main, Meri Patni Aur Woh (2005). She featured alongside Satabdi Roy and Koel Mallick in Raja Sen's Devipaksha (2004).

Setback (2008—2011)
Sengupta appeared in a host of films between 2008 and 2011, but only very few of those were commercially or critically successful. She starred as Damini in Suman Mukhopadhyay's Chaturanga (2008) which was the film adaptation of the novel of the same name by Rabindranath Tagore. The Times of India wrote that it was her best performance till date. The film failed to achieve commercial success. She featured in Mon Amour: Shesher Kobita Revisited (2008). The film became a major dud at the box office.

She accepted the role of a woman suffering from a turbulent conjugal relationship in Mahanagar@Kolkata (2010). She featured in Anjan Das' critically acclaimed but commercially unsuccessful film Bedeni (2011).

Resurgence and further roles (2012—present)
Sengupta featured in Agnidev Chatterjee's Charulata 2011 (2012). It narrates the story of a lonely woman whose workaholic husband does not have much time to spend with her. Eventually she meets a man younger than her and falls for him. She featured in Muktodhra (2012). She featured opposite Tapas Paul in Satabdi Roy's Om Shanti (2012) that also stars Rakhi Sawant in a dance number. Sengupta skipped the premier show of the film as she felt that Sawant had been given more preference than her in the poster of the film while Roy said that Sengupta's grievance was illogical. Sengupta later said that she regretted doing the role. The film received negative review. It was a major financial disaster.

Sengupta featured in Ratul Ganguly's 10 July (2014). The film failed to achieve critical favour and became a box office debacle.

She featured as Begum Jaan in Srijit Mukherji's Rajkahini (2015) and met box office success. Her character in the film is that of an aged prostitute who runs a brothel housing eleven women. The Times of India detected that Sengupta failed to land the coarseness of a rustic prostitute perfectly. News18 India appreciated her performance but deprecated her dubbing to be "a very forced husky baritone."

She featured opposite Prosenjit Chatterjee in Praktan (2016).

The poster for the Amitabh Bhattacharjee starrer jatra, Ekaler Karnaarjun (2017) claimed Sengupta to be the director. Sengupta negated that it was a misrepresentation while Indrajit Chakraborty, another actor of that jatra claimed that she was the guest director. She featured alongside Roopa Ganguly and Indrani Haldar in Aaro Ekbar (2017). Her Baranda (2017) was commercial disaster.

She won critical favour for her role as Chandrima Mukherjee in Prakash Bharadwaj's Colours of Life (2018). She featured as Sohini in Agnidev Chatterjee's Gaheen Hriday (2018) alongside Kaushik Sen playing Anupam. The film is based on the novel of the same name by Suchitra Bhattacharya. Her performance in the film was appreciated by critics. In Kamaleshwar Mukherjee's Goodnight City (2018) she featured as psychiatrist Abhiri Chatterjee who implores her husband who is a deputy commissioner with the detective department, not to be hard on the protagonist, a murderer whom she believes to be a psychologically distraught person. Her performance failed to win critical favour. The Times of India wrote on her performance, "she shows the compassionate side of her character nicely, the unemotional and professional psychiatrist goes missing every now and then." The film became another box office debacle. She played Kabita, an actress in Alamgir's Ekti Cinemar Golpo (2018). Viewers disliked her romantic collaboration with Arifin Shuvoo who is almost 15 years younger than her. Her performance in the film was deprecated by critics. The film became a major financial disaster.

2019 was another milestone year for Sengupta as she starred in various critically and commercially successful movies. She featured as a psychiatrist in Pritha Chakraborty's Mukherjee Dar Bou (2019). She had a fallout with the director of the film since the latter never fell into her suggestion to increase her screen time. The film turned out to be a major box office success. In Reshmi Mitra's Lime N Light (2019) she enacted double roles of Sreemoyee Sen, an actress and Archana Saha, a junior artiste. The junior artiste who is a lookalike of Sreemoyee Sen, takes her place after the latter met an accident. The Times of India wrote on her performance, "She is convincing as the naive Archana and confident as the superstar Sreemoyee." The film failed to draw viewers to the hall.

She received further critical acclaim for her role in Ahaa Re (2019). The movie was screened at the New York Indian Film Festival which was held virtually due to the COVID-19 Pandemic. Rituparna Sengupta was nominated for Best Actress. Thirdadvantagepoint.com listed her performance as the third best performance of the entire year. It was also listed as one of the best performances of the decade. The Times of India wrote in their review, "Rituparna gives Arifin and Paran Bandopadhyay a run for their money with her mature, measured performance as Basundhara — a woman whose past grief pushes her to put her heart and soul into cooking and caring for her family of three. Bhaskar Chattophadhyay from Firstpost wrote in his review: "Rituparna Sengupta is a treat to watch in this film. You have to see Sengupta in Ahaa Re to believe how much this is true. Every single frame of her cooking a dish, or even preparing to do so, is filled with so much love. Almost as if she is in a silent worship. Love, nourishment, gentleness, fondness – she defines these words with her performance. Her Basundhara is a woman who does not wear her emotions on her sleeves, but there is a scene towards the end of the film, when she can’t take it anymore and just breaks down. Keep your handkerchiefs ready. Asianmoviepulse.com wrote in their review: "Rituparna Sengupta is a splendid actor and portrays the character of Basundhara with subtle emotional traits. The character goes through different shades and the director uses many close shots to capture her facial expressions perfectly." .

In 2020 Sengupta starred in the Thriller The Parcel which was well received by critics and audiences. Bhaskar Chattophadhyay from Firstpost gave the film a positive review and called Senguptas performance brilliant: "The performances are superlative, though. Rituparna Sengupta is a strange mix of someone resigned to her fate in some matters, and at the same time, someone who can go to any extent to prevent any harm that might come to her family. By now, I am so used to seeing her excel in her roles, that I often commit the grave crime of overlooking the immense difficulties in playing a character as complicated as the one she does in this film. I am inclined to see that the lion's share of Parcel lies on her shoulders, and she is effortlessly brilliant in it.
Rossini Sarkar from Cinestaan wrote in her review: Rituparna Sengupta carries the film on her shoulders, gradually creating her state of depression through perpetual tension, unreasonable outbursts and a haggard look. Her expressions in close-up are outstanding.

In 2022, Sengupta appeared in Belashuru, the sequel to the popular family drama Belasheshe.  She will also be starring in her new women-centric crime thriller, Antardrishti directed by Kabir Lal. The latter is shot in four languages wherein Sengupta plays a double role in the Bengali version.

Personal life and image in media 

She married her childhood friend Sanjay Chakrabarti, founder and CEO of MobiApps on 13 December 1999 in Munshigonj and the couple has a son named Ankan and a daughter named Rishona Niya.

Sengupta has a deferential attitude to Debashree Roy whereas her attitude towards Satabdi Roy is oscillating. The relationship between the two got sour during the shooting of Prashanta Nanda's Laal Paan Bibi (1994) when Sengupta literally broke drown into tears after she was denounced for coming late to the set of the film, by Roy who was the bigger star by then. Roy cast Sengupta as the female lead in her directorial venture Om Shanti (2012). Both the actresses were interrogated whether their professional rivalry would affect the making of the film. Both of them denied such rivalry. 
Sengupta later claimed that she had been given lesser importance in the poster of the film while Roy said that the former's grievance is meaningless. Sengupta was absent at the premier show of the film, which generated the speculation in the media that the duo were no longer in talking terms. In April 2014, the duo were spotted talking again at a quiz contest conducted by Anandabazar Patrika.

Controversy
On 19 July 2019, Sengupta was interrogated by ED officers about an amount of near about 7 crore that she had received from the Rose Valley Group led by Gautam Kundu.

In the 2020 controversial vlog Let's Expose Face It, Sreelekha Mitra said that Sengupta wanted to play the lead in Tolly Lights that features Mitra as the protagonist. Mitra said that Sengupta made a phone call to Arjun Chakraborty, the director of the film and requested him to cast herself replacing Mitra.

Awards and honors

References

External links 

 
 
 

Actresses from Kolkata
Indian film actresses
Actresses in Bengali cinema
Actresses in Hindi cinema
Living people
Bengal Film Journalists' Association Award winners
Best Actress National Film Award winners
Lady Brabourne College alumni
University of Calcutta alumni
Kalakar Awards winners
Bengali Hindus
1970 births